Kevin Bertrand Burns (born March 3, 1980) is a former American mixed martial artist who previously competed in the Welterweight division. A professional competitor since 2006, he has formerly competed for the UFC.

Background
Originally from Glidden, Iowa, Burns was a talented football player, competing at the collegiate level. Burns later began training in Tae Kwon Do at the age of 18, before transitioning into Brazilian jiu-jitsu, and then finally mixed martial arts.

Mixed martial arts career

Early career
With only ten months of training, Burns made his amateur MMA debut, defeating Josh Neer. Burns took a year off after the win but returned when Neer called him out for a rematch. Burns took his first loss in the bout.

Four years later, Burns won his professional debut against Demi Deeds. He won his next fight before losing to Jason High. The loss did not slow down Burns, as he racked up three more wins. With the wins he earned a four-fight deal with the UFC.

Ultimate Fighting Championship
At UFC 85 Burns made his debut for the UFC, earning the upset win over Roan Carneiro. He submitted Roan in the second round and was awarded Submission of the Night.

During his fight with Anthony Johnson in UFC: Silva vs. Irvin, he repeatedly poked Johnson in the eyes, for which he received four separate warnings by the referee, Steve Mazzagatti.  In the third round, Johnson fell to the ground writhing in pain after an exchange with Burns, and Mazzagatti called the fight to protect Johnson, who was clearly unable to defend himself.  Only after seeing the replay from a different camera angle was it seen that the reason for Johnson falling to the ground was due to one of Burns' open handed jabs landing deep into his eye. After some confusion, Steve Mazzagatti stopped the bout. After the fight Johnson appealed the decision as being poked in the eye was a foul, but it was ultimately rejected due to lack of remedy. Burns has claimed that the eye-jabs were not intentional and due to a prior broken hand, which he states forced him to punch with a looser hand.

Johnson defeated Burns with a third-round knockout in their rematch at The Ultimate Fighter 8 Finale.

Burns was defeated by Chris Lytle via unanimous decision in a back and forth war at The Ultimate Fighter 9 Finale. The fight did prove to be positive as Burns was given an extra $25,000 for earning Fight of the Night.

Burns lost to T. J. Grant via first round TKO at UFC 107. After losing three straight bouts, Burns was released from the UFC.

Mixed martial arts record

|-
|Loss
|align=center|12–7 
|James Wood
|Decision (unanimous)	
| VFC 38: Roberts vs. Arocho 	
|
|align=center|5
|align=center|5:00
|Ralston, Nebraska, United States
|
|-
|Win
|align=center|12-6 
|Mark Stoddard
|Submission (shoulder choke)	
| MCC 43: High Octane	
|
|align=center|1
|align=center|2:52
|Des Moines, Iowa, United States
|
|-
|Win
|align=center|11–6 
|Mason Temiquel
|Submission (rear-naked choke)	
| MCC 42: Lund vs. Schmauss	
|
|align=center|1
|align=center|3:16
|Des Moines, Iowa, United States
|
|-
|Loss
|align=center|10–6 
|Tom Speer
|Decision (split)
|Brutaal: Fight Night
|
|align=center|3
|align=center|5:00
|Tama, Iowa, United States
|
|-
|Win
|align=center|10–5 
|Eddie Larrea
|Submission (rear-naked choke)	
|MCC 37: Thanksgiving Throwdown	
|
|align=center|1
|align=center|1:09
|Des Moines, Iowa, United States
|
|-
|Loss
|align=center|9–5 
|Koffi Adzitso
|KO (punches) 
|ZarMMA: Fight Night  
|
|align=center|1
|align=center|1:54
|Layton, Utah, United States
|
|-
|Win
|align=center|9–4 
|Kalel Robinson
|Submission (arm-triangle choke)
|MCC 28: Impact  
|
|align=center|1
|align=center|3:18
|Des Moines, Iowa, United States
|
|-
|Win
|align=center|8–4 
|Sean Huffman
|Decision (unanimous)
|MCC 25: Inferno
|
|align=center|3
|align=center|5:00
|Des Moines, Iowa, United States
|
|-
|Loss
|align=center|7–4 
|T. J. Grant
|TKO (punches)
|UFC 107
|
|align=center|1
|align=center|4:57
|Memphis, Tennessee, United States
|
|-
|Loss
|align=center|7–3 
|Chris Lytle
|Decision (unanimous)
|The Ultimate Fighter 9 Finale
|
|align=center|3
|align=center|5:00
|Las Vegas, Nevada, United States
|
|-
|Loss
|align=center|7–2 
|Anthony Johnson
|KO (head kick)
|The Ultimate Fighter 8 Finale
|
|align=center|3
|align=center|0:28
|Las Vegas, Nevada, United States
|
|-
| Win
|align=center|7-1
|Anthony Johnson
|TKO (eye poke)
|UFC Fight Night: Silva vs. Irvin
|
|align=center|3
|align=center|3:35
|Las Vegas, Nevada, United States
|
|-
|Win
|align=center|6–1
|Roan Carneiro
|Submission (triangle choke)
|UFC 85
|
|align=center|2
|align=center|2:53
|London, England
|
|-
|Win
|align=center|5–1
|Bobby Voelker
|KO (punch)
|VFC 23: Validation
|
|align=center|1
|align=center|0:30
|Council Bluffs, Iowa, United States
|
|-
|Win
|align=center|4–1
|Steve Schneider
|Submission (triangle choke)
|GFC 2
|
|align=center|2
|align=center|4:13
|Des Moines, Iowa, United States
|
|-
|Win
|align=center|3–1
|Sean Westbrook
|Submission (rear-naked choke)
|GFC 1: Genesis
|
|align=center|1
|align=center|3:22
|Des Moines, Iowa, United States
|
|-
|Loss
|align=center|2–1
|Jason High
|TKO (doctor stoppage)
|VFC 18: Hitmen
|
|align=center|2
|align=center|5:00
|Council Bluffs, Iowa, United States
|
|-
|Win
|align=center|2–0
|Matt Delanoit
|Submission (armbar)
|VFC 17: Predators
|
|align=center|1
|align=center|3:29
|Council Bluffs, Iowa, United States
|
|-
|Win
|align=center|1–0
|Demi Deeds
|TKO (punches)
|Greensparks: Full Contact Fighting 1
|
|align=center|1
|align=center|3:58
|Clive, Iowa, United States
|

References

External links

UFC Profile

Living people
American male mixed martial artists
Mixed martial artists from Iowa
Welterweight mixed martial artists
Mixed martial artists utilizing taekwondo
Mixed martial artists utilizing Brazilian jiu-jitsu
American practitioners of Brazilian jiu-jitsu
American male taekwondo practitioners
1980 births
People from Carroll, Iowa
Ultimate Fighting Championship male fighters